Dungeons & Daddies is an actual play Dungeons & Dragons comedy podcast.

Description
Dungeons & Daddies is an unscripted comedy podcast done as an ongoing series of role-playing sessions loosely based on the fifth edition of Dungeons & Dragons. It first aired in January 2019.

Plot
During a trip to a soccer tournament, four suburban dads and their sons are teleported into the Forgotten Realms. When their children are kidnapped, the dads begin a quest to rescue them. Season two takes place 25 years later, in a post-apocalyptic version of San Dimas, California. The teenage grandchildren of season one's characters are tasked with finding their fathers, who have disappeared with little explanation. The early episodes of season two loosely follow a "Monster of the Week" format.

Cast
Being an actual-play podcast, the principal cast features not only players but a gamemaster responsible for game management and the portrayal of most minor characters. This role is taken by Anthony Burch outside of special episodes. There are four other principal cast members, who play four dads in season 1, and four of those characters' grandchildren in season two.  Both seasons have had guest players, though not all guests have had characters with standard player classes.

Campaigns

Major and minor campaigns are listed below. Includes patreon-only campaigns as well.

Characters

Season 1

Season 2

Lincoln Lee Wilson

Normally Oak Swallows

-Doesn't shower

Taylor Swift 

-Doesn't shower but smells better than Normal.

Scary Marlow

-Betrays her friends and all the listeners

Pandemic issues
Cast member Freddie Wong said that early in the COVID pandemic, the podcast, which earns money via subscription and Patreon donations, lost a significant number of subscribers, many of whom had been laid off. However, by July 2020, the podcast had begun to regain subscribers.

Reception
On the website Geekiary, Em Rowntree liked the podcast, noting that knowledge of Dungeons & Dragons was not necessary, the content was hilarious, and the technical production values were very high. Rowntree concluded, "Once you've listened to the podcast, you will feel the urge to share your love for it with others. You'll want to spread the word of its hilarity to your nearest and dearest."

As of July 2022, the podcast had over 26,000 supporters on Patreon and was in the top 100 podcasts by listeners on Spotify.

Awards
At the 2019 AudioVerse Awards, Dungeons & Daddies won the award for "New Improvised Production", and Anthony Burch won the award for "Player Direction of a New Production".

References

External links 
 

2019 podcast debuts
Actual play podcasts
Audio podcasts
Dungeons & Dragons actual play
Fantasy podcasts
Patreon creators